The 1847 Rhode Island gubernatorial election was held on April 7, 1847.

Incumbent Law and Order Governor Byron Diman did not run for re-election. Whig nominee Elisha Harris defeated Democratic nominee Olney Ballou.

General election

Candidates
Olney Ballou, Democratic, incumbent State Senator
Elisha Harris, Whig, incumbent Lieutenant Governor of Rhode Island

Results

References

1847
Rhode Island
Gubernatorial